Edvard Engelsaas (17 November 1872 – 30 August 1902) was a Norwegian speed skater and world champion. 

Engelsaas won a gold medal at the 1900 World Allround Speed Skating Championships for Men, after winning three of the distances, the 1500m, 5000m and 10000m.

National championships
He received a silver medal at the 1898 Norwegian allround championship, a bronze medal in 1899, and a gold medal in 1900.

He represented the club Trondhjems Skøiteklub.

References

1872 births
1902 deaths
Norwegian male speed skaters
World Allround Speed Skating Championships medalists
Sportspeople from Trondheim
19th-century Norwegian people